The Sounds of Jimmy Smith is an album by American jazz organist Jimmy Smith featuring performances recorded in 1957 and released on the Blue Note label. The CD reissue added three tunes recorded at the same session as bonus tracks.

Reception
The Allmusic review by Scott Yanow awarded the album 3 stars calling it:

Track listing

 "There Will Never Be Another You" (Mack Gordon, Harry Warren) – 5:35
 "The Fight" (Jimmy Smith) – 5:05
 "Blue Moon" (Lorenz Hart, Richard Rodgers) – 8:42
 "All the Things You Are" (Oscar Hammerstein II, Jerome Kern) – 5:37
 "Zing! Went the Strings of My Heart" (James F. Hanley) – 8:37
 "Somebody Loves Me" (Buddy DeSylva, Ballard MacDonald, George Gershwin) – 5:14

Bonus tracks on 2003 CD reissue
  "First Night Blues" (Smith) – 8:06 
 "Cherokee" (Ray Noble) – 8:12 
 "The Third Day" (Smith) – 6:41
Recorded at Manhattan Towers in New York City on February 11 (tracks 5 & 7), February 12 (track 6) and February 13 (tracks 1-4, 8 & 9), 1957

Personnel

Musicians
Jimmy Smith – organ
Eddie McFadden – guitar (tracks 1, 3, 5-8)
Donald Bailey – drums (tracks 1, 3, 6, 8)
Art Blakey - drums (tracks 5, 7)

Technical
 Alfred Lion – producer
 Rudy Van Gelder – engineer
 Harold Feinstein – photography
 Leonard Feather – liner notes

References

Blue Note Records albums
Jimmy Smith (musician) albums
1957 albums
Albums produced by Alfred Lion